Planet Pachinko is a WiiWare game by American studio Allied Kingdoms. It was released in North America on January 12, 2009.

Gameplay
The player takes control of the members of a robot family who explore the abandoned temples of the ancient Pachinkeet civilization, their architecture inspired by pachinko machines, destroying pachinko balls along the way to pass each stage. In their way is the space pirate Vile Vill and his crew, who are also exploring the temples and hoping to loot them of their riches.

The game can be played single player or with a friend in two-player co-op.

Reception
IGN called the concept unique and hilarious, but overall felt that many aspects of the game were sloppy, inconsistent and unfinished in execution. They gave it 3/10. WiiWare World noted the original aspects of the game, but felt that the combination of intense, overwhelming action and loose controls took much of the enjoyment out of the game, giving it 5/10.

References

External links
 Official Website

2009 video games
Shooter video games
Video games developed in the United States
WiiWare games
Wii-only games
Wii games
North America-exclusive video games